The Honourable Peniston Lamb (3 May 1770 – 24 January 1805) was a British politician.

Background
Lamb was the eldest son of Peniston Lamb, 1st Viscount Melbourne, and Elizabeth, daughter of Sir Ralph Milbanke, 5th Baronet. Prime Minister William Lamb, 2nd Viscount Melbourne, Frederick Lamb, 3rd Viscount Melbourne and the Hon. George Lamb were his younger brothers. Due to their mother's numerous love affairs, only Peniston is likely to have been Lord Melbourne's son.

Political career
Lamb was elected Member of Parliament (MP) for Newport in 1793, and held the seat until 1796. He was elected as MP for Hertfordshire in 1802, a seat he held until his death three years later.

Personal life
Peniston Lamb had an affair with Mrs Sophia Musters née Heywood (1758–1819).

Lamb died of tuberculosis in January 1805, aged 34, unmarried without children.  He spent his last days at the Royal Pavilion in Brighton.

References

External links 
 
 

1770 births
1805 deaths
Members of Parliament for Newport (Isle of Wight)
British MPs 1790–1796
Members of the Parliament of the United Kingdom for Hertfordshire
UK MPs 1802–1806
Heirs apparent who never acceded